Chapcha Gewog (Dzongkha: སྐྱབས་ཆ་,Chaapchha Gewog) is a gewog (village block) of Chukha District, Bhutan. It has an area of 112.6 square kilometres and contains 11 villages.

Settlements 
Chapchha

References

Gewogs of Bhutan
Chukha District